The Paralympic Committee of Kosovo became a member of the International Paralympic Committee on 16 July 2022. Kosovo is expected to make its Paralympic debut at the 2024 Summer Paralympics in Paris, France.

Medal tables

Medals by Summer Games

Medals by Winter Games

See also
Kosovo at the Olympics
Special Olympics Kosovo

References

External links
Paralympic Committee of Kosovo
Paralympic Committee of Kosovo profile at the International Paralympic Committee

Kosovo at multi-sport events